Beta Coronae Australis (Beta CrA), Latinized from β Coronae Australis, is a solitary star located in the southern constellation Corona Australis. It is visible to the naked eye as a faint, orange-hued star with an apparent visual magnitude of 4.10. At its current distance, Beta CrA's brightness is diminished by 0.29 magnitudes due to interstellar dust.

Beta CrA has a  stellar classification of K0 II/III CN1.5, indicating that it is an evolved K-type star with the blended luminosity class of a bright giant and a regular giant star. The suffix CN1.5 indicates that the object has an anamolous overabundance of cyano radicals in its spectrum, making it a CN star. Having exhausted the supply of hydrogen at its core, the star has expanded to 39 times the Sun's girth.

References

K-type bright giants
Corona Australis
Coronae Australis, Beta
CD-39 13146
178345
094160
7259
K-type giants
CN stars